Eva Giganti (born 29 May 1976) is an Italian weightlifter. She competed in the women's flyweight event at the 2000 Summer Olympics.

References

1976 births
Living people
Italian female weightlifters
Olympic weightlifters of Italy
Weightlifters at the 2000 Summer Olympics
People from San Cataldo, Sicily
Sportspeople from the Province of Caltanissetta
20th-century Italian women